Leonard Everett Burnett (born August 29, 1939) is a former American football player who played for Pittsburgh Steelers of the National Football League (NFL). He played college football at the University of Oregon.

References

1939 births
Living people
Oregon Ducks football players
Pittsburgh Steelers players
American football defensive backs